Salve Thomassen Hodne (28 September 1845 – 22 February 1916) was a Norwegian businessperson and politician.

He was elected to the Parliament of Norway in 1889, and was re-elected in 1895, 1898 and 1900, representing the constituency of Kristiansand. He worked as a shipyard owner in that city.

References

1845 births
1916 deaths
Norwegian businesspeople
Members of the Storting
Politicians from Kristiansand